Iona is a bounded rural locality in Victoria, Australia,  south-east of Melbourne's Central Business District, located within the Shire of Cardinia local government area. Iona recorded a population of 240 at the 2021 census.

Iona is part of the Cardinia Shire Council. It is made up of mostly farm land.

History
Bunyip South Post Office opened on 26 August 1898, was renamed Iona in 1905 and closed in 1977. St Josephs Catholic Church at Iona was opened on 16 December 1900 by the Reverend Father Gleeson. The original building was replaced in 1940 by the existing brick building. St Josephs Catholic School opened on 11 April 1915.

See also
 Shire of Pakenham — Iona was previously within this former local government area.

References

Towns in Victoria (Australia)
Shire of Cardinia